The Arkansas Ordnance Plant Guard House is a historic military structure on the grounds of the Jacksonville Museum of Military History in Jacksonville, Arkansas. It is presently mounted on a concrete pad to the right of the main museum building, believed to be not far from its original location. It was built in 1941 as part of the facilities of the World War II-era Arkansas Ordnance Plant, a facility that produced fuses and detonators in Jacksonville. After the war it was moved to 1112 MacArthur Drive, and it was moved to the museum in 2006.

See also
National Register of Historic Places listings in Pulaski County, Arkansas

References

Government buildings on the National Register of Historic Places in Arkansas
Military installations established in 1941
Buildings and structures in Pulaski County, Arkansas
World War II on the National Register of Historic Places
National Register of Historic Places in Pulaski County, Arkansas
Jacksonville, Arkansas
1941 establishments in Arkansas
Military history of Arkansas